The Unattached Companies of Massachusetts Volunteer Militia were units of infantry raised for the defenses of the eastern coast of 
Massachusetts during the American Civil War. Twenty-six companies were mustered into the Union Army during 1864-1865, several of them reorganizing for additional terms of service.

History
Beginning in April 1864, companies of infantry were needed for guard and garrison duty along the coast of Massachusetts; to be stationed at the numerous military posts located there for a ninety-day period. With the Independent Division of Militia, a home guard militia organization, already established in the state in 1863, eight companies were recruited from their ranks, and mustered into United States service. Five other companies were detached from existing regiments of the Massachusetts Militia to finish the required roster.

Their term of enlistment soon ending, a call for 100-day companies was then ordered in July and August 1864 to fill the soon to be vacant positions at the coastal forts. Again, the state militia regiments were used to fill most of the quota, with a need to only recruit two new companies.

In late October 1864, the office of the Adjutant General released orders to the commanding officers of the "Companies of One Hundred Days Troops belonging to Massachusetts, now doing garrison duty at the forts on the coast", to reenlist their commands for one year, and to fill with new recruits any positions held by those men not choosing to rejoin. Six of the 100-day companies were re-mustered, including the 2nd Unattached Company now beginning its third term. None of the one-year companies finished a full term, as the war had come to an end, and all were mustered out by July 1865.

Unattached Companies

No 14th Unattached Company was mentioned by Higginson, Bowen or Adjutant General records. The 90-day companies numbered 13, and the 100-day ones started with #15, the reenlisting 2nd Unattached numerically the 14th.

Massachusetts Volunteer Militia
Many of the new Unattached Companies were organized from companies previously in, or detached from, regiments of volunteer militia infantry units in Federal service from Massachusetts. They included:
3rd Regiment Massachusetts Volunteer Militia
Co A = 22nd Unatt., Co E = 15th Unatt., Co H = 18th Unatt., Co I = 23rd Unatt.
4th Regiment Massachusetts Volunteer Militia
Co E = 20th Unatt.
6th Regiment Massachusetts Volunteer Militia
Co I = 8th Unatt.
7th Regiment Massachusetts Volunteer Militia
Co K = 17th Unatt.
8th Regiment Massachusetts Volunteer Militia
Co C = 27th Unatt., Co E = 2nd Unatt., Co I = 11th Unatt.
42nd Massachusetts Volunteer Infantry Regiment
Co G = 7th Unatt.
50th Massachusetts Infantry Regiment
Co A = 13th Unatt.

Citations

References

 Online version of Higginson data at CivilWarArchive.com, from Dyer's Compendium

See also
List of Massachusetts Civil War Units
Massachusetts in the American Civil War

Units and formations of the Union Army from Massachusetts
1864 establishments in Massachusetts
Military units and formations established in 1864
Military units and formations disestablished in 1865